Rachel Cuschieri (born 26 April 1992) is a Maltese professional footballer who plays as a midfielder for Italian Serie A club UC Sampdoria and the Malta women's national team. She first played in the Champions League in 2010.

Early life

Rachel began playing football at the age of five with San Gwann Football Nursery. She trained up to the age of 13 with the boys' team being the only girl within such age group. San Gwann Football Nursery does not have a ladies football team and her development could not progress any further due to restrictions in place within the Maltese footballing authorities that, although she was still a minor she could not play competitive games. Birkirkara became aware of her potential and signed her.

Playing career

Club 
Within a few months of joining B'kara Football Club, Rachel was playing with the Birkirkara first team at the age of 13. 

During the summer of 2014, she became the first Maltese female professional footballer to play outside Malta, when she signed for Cypriot side Apollon Limassol.

International
Cuschieri was selected for the Malta women's national football team and made her debut against Switzerland at the age of 14, which at the time was a record.

During the 2013 European Championship qualifying's preliminary stage, Cuschieri scored against Armenia. She is currently the leading all-time scorer for and the youngest-ever goal scorer.

References

External links
 

1992 births
Living people
Maltese women's footballers
Malta women's international footballers
RSC Anderlecht (women) players
Apollon Ladies F.C. players
PSV (women) players
S.S. Lazio Women 2015 players
U.C. Sampdoria (women) players
Expatriate women's footballers in Cyprus
Expatriate women's footballers in Belgium
Maltese expatriate sportspeople in Belgium
Maltese expatriate sportspeople in Cyprus
Maltese expatriate sportspeople in Italy
Maltese expatriate footballers
Women's association football midfielders
Super League Vrouwenvoetbal players
Eredivisie (women) players
Expatriate women's footballers in the Netherlands
Expatriate women's footballers in Italy
Maltese LGBT people
LGBT association football players